In cricket, an over consists of six legal deliveries bowled from one end of a cricket pitch to the player batting at the other end, almost always by a single bowler.

A maiden over is an over in which no runs are scored that count against the bowler (so leg byes and byes may be scored as they are not counted against the bowler). A wicket maiden is a maiden over in which a wicket is also taken. Similarly, double and triple wicket maidens are when two and three wickets are taken in a maiden over.

After six deliveries the umpire calls 'over'; the fielding team switches ends, and a different bowler is selected to bowl from the opposite end. The captain of the fielding team decides which bowler will bowl any given over, and no bowler may bowl two overs in succession.

Overview
Although this has not always been so, with overs of four and eight balls used in the past, currently an over must consist of six legal deliveries. If the bowler bowls a wide or a no-ball, that illegal delivery is not counted towards the six-ball tally, and another delivery must be bowled in its place.

During the middle of an over, in the event that a bowler is injured or is sent out of the attack by the umpire (for disciplinary reasons, such as bowling beamers), a teammate completes any remaining deliveries.

Because a bowler may not bowl consecutive overs, the general tactic is for the captain to appoint two bowlers to alternate overs from opposite ends. When one bowler tires or becomes ineffective, the captain will replace that bowler with another. The period of time during which a bowler bowls every alternate over is known as a spell.

In limited overs cricket matches, bowlers are generally restricted in the total number of overs they may bowl in a match. The general rule is that no bowler can bowl more than 20% of the total overs per innings; thus, in a 50-over match each bowler can bowl a maximum of 10 overs.

In Test and first-class cricket, there is no limit to the number of overs in a team's innings, nor is there any limit to how many may be bowled by a single bowler. In these matches, there is a requirement to bowl a minimum of 90 overs in a day's play, to ensure a good spectacle, and to prevent the fielding team from wasting time for tactical reasons.

Number of overs in each format of cricket
There is only one innings per team in these formats:
One Day International: 50 overs per innings
T20 cricket: 20 overs per innings
100-ball cricket: 20 5-ball overs per innings (Called a "five", and bowlers can bowl 2 "fives" in a row. After 10 balls, the ends switch)
T10 cricket: 10 overs per innings

Tactical considerations

Tactical considerations in bowling overs
The over is a fundamental consideration in the tactical planning of the fielding side. Since a single bowler has only six legal balls to bowl before they must hand the ball to another bowler, the bowler typically plans to use those six balls to set up a pattern of play designed to get a batting player out. For example, they may bowl the first few balls with the same line, length, or spin. The bowler intends to tempt the batting player into scoring runs by providing balls that are relatively easy to hit. If the batting player takes the bait, the bowler can then follow up with a variation designed to hit the wicket, or a ball that is intended to induce a mistake from a batting player who is still in aggressive run-scoring mode, which will result in the batting player being caught out.

Cricket imposes penalties if a team bowls its overs at a very slow over rate, such as fines, loss of competition points, and match bans. If a team is proceeding slowly, some captains will choose to use slow/spin bowlers. Such bowlers have a shorter run up so they complete their overs more quickly. Often this means choosing an inferior strategy by employing a less skilful bowler to avoid penalties that are perceived to be greater, such as being banned or losing points.

Bowling a maiden over in ODI and T20 forms of cricket is quite rare and difficult, as the batting players seek to maximise their scoring opportunities.

Tactical considerations in batting
If the two batting players are not similar, tactical considerations may affect their play. If one batting player is stronger than the other, they may attempt to engineer their scoring so that the stronger batting player faces the bowling more often.  This is known as farming the strike. It may take the form of the stronger batting player trying to score an even number of runs on early balls in the over and an odd number on the last ball; the weaker batting player will attempt the reverse, and the bowler will try to disrupt this pattern.

If one batting player is right-handed and the other left-handed, they may try to score odd numbers of runs to disrupt the bowling pattern and tire the fielders by making them reposition themselves frequently.

Historical number of balls per over in Test cricket
Since 1979/80, all Test cricket has been played with six balls per over. However, overs in Test cricket originally had four balls per over, and there have been varying numbers of balls per over around the world up to 1979/80, generally the same as the number of balls per over in force in other first-class cricket in that country.

Prior to the Laws of Cricket (1980 Code), law 17.1 (Number of balls [in the over]) did not explicitly specify the number of balls to be bowled in an over, but merely stated that the number of balls should be agreed by the two captains prior to the toss. In practice, the number of balls was usually stipulated in the playing regulations governing the match being played. Although six was the usual number of balls, it was not always the case. From the 1980 code onwards, law 17.1 was amended to read, "The ball shall be bowled from each end alternately in overs of 6 balls".

Balls per over

In England
 1880 to 1888: 4
 1889 to 1899: 5
 1900 to 1938: 6
 1939 to 1945: 8
 1946 to date: 6

In Australia
 1876/77 to 1887/88: 4
 1891/92 to 1920/21: 6
 1924/25: 8
 1928/29 to 1932/33: 6 
 1936/37 to 1978/79: 8 
 1979/80 to date: 6

In South Africa
 1888/89: 4 
 1891/92 to 1898/99: 5 
 1902/03 to 1935/36: 6 
 1938/39 to 1957/58: 8 
 1961/62 to date: 6

In New Zealand
 1929/30 to 1967/68: 6 
 1968/69 to 1978/79: 8 
 1979/80 to date: 6

In Pakistan
 1954/55 to 1972/73: 6 
 1974/75 to 1977/78: 8 
 1978/79 to date: 6

In India, West Indies, Sri Lanka, Zimbabwe, Bangladesh, the United Arab Emirates (venue, not host) and Ireland all Test matches have been played with six ball overs.

See also

Over rate

References

Bowling (cricket)
Cricket laws and regulations
Cricket terminology
Scoring (cricket)
Cricket